Astrochapsa is a genus of lichen-forming fungi in the subfamily Graphidoideae of the family Graphidaceae. It has 28 species. The genus was circumscribed by Sittiporn Parnmen, Robert Lücking, and H. Thorsten Lumbsch in 2012, with Astrochapsa astroidea assigned as the type species. It was segregated from the genus Chapsa, from which it differs in having a more frequently densely corticate thallus, an apothecial margin that is mostly recurved, and the almost exclusively subdistoseptate (with slightly thickened septa and angular lumina), non-amyloid ascospores.

Species

Astrochapsa albella 
Astrochapsa alstrupii 
Astrochapsa amazonica 
Astrochapsa astroidea 
Astrochapsa calathiformis 
Astrochapsa columnaris 
Astrochapsa elongata 
Astrochapsa fusca 
Astrochapsa graphidioides 
Astrochapsa kalbii 
Astrochapsa lassae 
Astrochapsa lobata 
Astrochapsa magnifica 
Astrochapsa martinicensis 
Astrochapsa mastersonii 
Astrochapsa megaphlyctidioides 
Astrochapsa meridensis 
Astrochapsa mirabilis 
Astrochapsa platycarpella 
Astrochapsa pseudophlyctis 
Astrochapsa pulvereodiscus 
Astrochapsa recurva 
Astrochapsa sipmanii 
Astrochapsa stellata 
Astrochapsa submuralis 
Astrochapsa verruculosa 
Astrochapsa waasii 
Astrochapsa wolseleyana 
Astrochapsa zahlbruckneri

References

Graphidaceae
Lichen genera
Taxa described in 2012
Ostropales genera
Taxa named by Helge Thorsten Lumbsch
Taxa named by Robert Lücking